Orisa Oluwa is a deity of Yoruba mythology who forbids the use of umbrellas in Iwoye-Ketu, a town in Ogun State, southwestern Nigeria. 
The deity is one of the three items brought to the town by King Olumu from Ile Ife and the other items includes a crown and a staff called "Opa Ogbo".

References

Yoruba goddesses
People from Ogun State